Abdulaziz Ali (born June 5, 1980) is a Qatari footballer. He currently plays as a goalkeeper for Muaither.

Ali is also a member of the Qatar national football team.

Career
Ali joined the youth team of Al-Gharafa in 1996. He joined the first team in 1998, and was the second choice goalkeeper, behind legendary Qatari international Amer Al Kaabi. Three years later he was promoted to the first choice goalkeeper. He gradually dropped to the reserve team in the 2009/10 season.

References

External links

Instagram

1980 births
Living people
Qatari footballers
Qatar international footballers
2004 AFC Asian Cup players
Al-Gharafa SC players
Muaither SC players
Association football goalkeepers
Qatari Second Division players
Qatar Stars League players